Pimelea spinescens or spiny riceflower is a critically endangered shrub native to central and western Victoria, Australia. P. spinescens grows to up to 30 cm tall and is found in lowland grassland. The plant is dioecious and unlike others of its genus is non-toxic.

Subspecies 

Pimelea spinescens has two known subspecies:

 P. s. subsp. spinescens 
 P. s. subsp. pubiflora

References 

 http://www.rbg.vic.gov.au/science/projects/conservation-genetics/conservation-genetics-of-pimelea-spinescens
 http://www.viridans.com/RAREPL/oncecommon.htm

Flora of Victoria (Australia)
Taxa named by Barbara Lynette Rye
Dioecious plants